James Fraser (ca 1785 – September 15, 1844) was a merchant and political figure in Lower Canada. He represented Montreal West in the Legislative Assembly of Lower Canada from 1814 to 1816.

Fraser was a broker and auctioneer at Montreal. In 1814, he married Ann Brownson. He was defeated when he ran for reelection in 1816. Fraser died in Montreal.

References 
 
 

1780s births
1844 deaths
Members of the Legislative Assembly of Lower Canada
Year of birth uncertain